Spycimir, also Spyćmier, Spyćmir, Spyćmierz, Spićymierz, etc., is an old Polish masculine given name. Etymology: spyci-: "in vain", -mir: "peace". Diminutives: Spytko, Spytek. Its name day is 26 April.

Given name

Walerian Spycimir Tarnowski (1811-1861), Polish count, father of Władysław Tarnowski
Spytko I of Melsztyn,  (14th century), Polish nobleman, castellan of Krakow,  and Wiślica    
Spytko II of Melsztyn (died 1399), Polish nobleman, voivode of Krakow
Spytko III of Melsztyn (1398-1439), Polish nobleman
 (d. 1503), Polish nobleman, voivode of Krakow
Spytek I of Jarosław (cca. 1367- 1435), Polish nobleman
 (d. 1444), Polish nobleman
 (cca. 1436-1519), Polish nobleman, voivode of Krakow
 (d.1553), Polish nobleman and statesman
 (1514-1568), Polish nobleman and statesman
 (1518-1568), Polish nobleman and statesman (Great Crown Treasurer, also castellan and voivode of several cities)
Mikołaj Spytek Ligęza (c. 1562–1637), Polish–Lithuanian nobleman

Surname
Heather Spytek (born 1977), American model
John Spytek, American footballer and football executive

Places
Spycimierz,  a village in the Poddębice County, Łódź Voivodeship, Poland
Spycimierz-Kolonia,  a village in the Poddębice County, Łódź Voivodeship, Poland

See also
Spytimir, Czech variant

References

Polish masculine given names
Polish-language surnames